Oksana Vitalyevna Tretyakova (also transliterated as Oxana Tretyakova; born 10 March 1979) is a Russian retired ice hockey player. She represented  in the women’s ice hockey tournaments at the Winter Olympics in 2002 and 2006, and at seven IIHF Women's World Championships.

Her club career, which spanned more than twenty-seasons, was played in the Zhenskaya Hockey League (ZhHL) and its predecessor, the Russian Women's Hockey League, with HC SKIF and Biryusa Krasnoyarsk.

References

External links
 

1979 births
Living people
Russian women's ice hockey forwards
Olympic ice hockey players of Russia
Ice hockey players at the 2002 Winter Olympics
Ice hockey players at the 2006 Winter Olympics
Sportspeople from Krasnoyarsk
Biryusa Krasnoyarsk players
HC SKIF players